In the sociology and history of science, the harem effect refers to a phenomenon whereby a male scientist, in a position of power, predominantly hires female subordinates for his research team.

History
While there are numerous historical examples of this phenomenon and the practice may continue today, two examples stand out in the literature. Erwin Frink Smith, a USDA plant pathologist in the Bureau of Plant Industry, hired more than twenty female assistants at the agency to study various agricultural problems in the late 19th and early 20th century. Edward Charles Pickering, astrophysicist and director of the Harvard College Observatory, assembled what became known as “Pickering's Harem”—an all-female staff of a dozen or more to assist in his research program to gather and analyze stellar spectra.

Possible reasons suggested for this effect include the significantly lower pay required (allowing many more assistants to be hired) and reduced competition from a "bevy of female subordinates, competent but less threatening than an equal number of bright young men." In Smith's case, a further factor may have been USDA's structural exclusion of women from taking the examinations that would have allowed them to enter the higher-ranking jobs for which they were qualified.

References

External links
 Photograph of Pickering's Harem (1912)

Sociology of science